Popsicle may refer to:

Food
 Ice pop, a type of frozen snack on a stick
 Popsicle (brand), an ice pop brand in the U.S. and Canada

Music
 Popsicle (band), a 1990s Swedish pop band
 Popsicle (album) by Diamond Nights, 2005
 The Popsicle, an EP by Zolof the Rock & Roll Destroyer, or the title song, 2004
 "Popsicle" (song), by Jan & Dean, 1963
 "Popsicle", a song by Kovas, 2007
 "Popsicle", a song by Talking Heads from Bonus Rarities and Outtakes, 2006
 "Popsicle", the theme instrumental for the South Korean reality show UHSN, 2019
 Popsicle Records, an American record label founded by Jeffree Star

Other uses
 M-K TE70-4S, nicknamed "Popsicle", a diesel locomotive
 Popsicle Peak, a mountain on Vancouver Island, British Columbia, Canada

See also